Thorfinnsson may refer to:

Björn Thorfinnsson (born 1979), Icelandic chess player and journalist
Bragi Þorfinnsson (born 1981), Icelandic chess grandmaster
Paul and Erlend Thorfinnsson; Paul (died after 1098) and Erlend (died 1098) ruled together as Earls of Orkney
Snorri Thorfinnsson (born between 1005 and 1013), the first European to be born in North America